Sanggal Station is a subway station of the Bundang Line, the commuter subway line of Korail, the national railway of South Korea.

The station was opened in December 2012, as part of the latest southward extension of the Bundang Line.

Seoul Metropolitan Subway stations
Railway stations opened in 2012
Metro stations in Yongin